= King Hill (Greene County, New York) =

Mountain in New York, United States

- Location within New York Adirondack Park Location within the United States

Highest point
- Elevation: 892 feet (272 m)
- Coordinates: 42°23′17″N 73°58′26″W

Geography
- Location: E of Greenville Center, New York, U.S.
- Topo map: USGS Alcove

King Hill is a mountain in Greene County, New York. It is located in the Catskill Mountains east of Greenville Center. Murder Bridge Hill is located north-northwest of King Hill.
