= Murder Bridge Hill =

Mountain in New York, United States

- Location within New York Adirondack Park Location within the United States

Highest point
- Elevation: 833 feet (254 m)
- Coordinates: 42°24′13″N 73°58′53″W

Geography
- Location: NE of Greenville Center, New York, U.S.
- Topo map: USGS Alcove

Murder Bridge Hill is a mountain in Greene County, New York. It is located in the Catskill Mountains northeast of Greenville Center. King Hill is located south-southeast of Murder Bridge Hill.
